Beis Yisrael, also spelled Beis Yisroel, Bais Yisroel, or Beit Yisrael, may refer to:

Beit Yisrael, a neighborhood in Jerusalem, Israel
Yisrael Alter, the fourth Gerrer Rebbe, known as the Beis Yisrael
Yeshivas Bais Yisroel, a post-high-school yeshiva in Neve Yaakov, Jerusalem